Scepticism and Animal Faith (1923) is a later work by Spanish-born American philosopher George Santayana. He intended it to be "merely the introduction to a new system of philosophy," a work that would later be called The Realms of Being, which constitutes the bulk of his philosophy, along with The Life of Reason.

Scepticism is Santayana's major treatise on epistemology; after its publication, he wrote no more on the topic. His preface begins humbly, with Santayana saying:

Moreover, he does not claim philosophical supremacy: 

While Santayana acknowledges the importance of skepticism to philosophy, and begins by doubting almost everything; from here, he seeks to find some kind of epistemological truths. Idealism is correct, claims Santayana, but is of no consequence. He makes this pragmatic claim by asserting that men do not live by the principles of idealism, even if it is true. We have functioned for eons without adhering to such principles, and may continue, pragmatically, as such. He posits the necessity of the eponymous "Animal Faith", which is belief in that which our senses tell us; "Philosophy begins in medias res", he assures us at the beginning of his treatise.

References

External links
 The full text of Scepticism and Animal Faith at the Internet Archive

1923 non-fiction books
American non-fiction books
Books by George Santayana
Contemporary philosophical literature
English-language books
Epistemology literature
Skepticism